KWLD may refer to:

 KWLD (FM), a radio station (91.5 FM) licensed to Plainview, Texas, United States
 Strother Field (ICAO code KWLD)